National Alliance of High-level Local Universities, abbreviated as NAHLU, was formed jointly by Beijing University of Technology, Soochow University, Shanghai University, Zhengzhou University and Nanchang University in 2012.

History 
On December 2012, the first summit was held in Beijing University of Technology.

On December 2013, National Regional High-Level University Development Summit held in Suzhou, organized by the Union with assistance of Soochow University and Shanghai University.

On October, 2014, Union summit held in Zhengzhou University. Leaders and representatives from 49 local colleges and universities participated.

References 

Educational organizations